Perparim Beqaj (born 3 August 1995) is a Swedish footballer who plays as a forward for Norrby.

Career

Club career
On 26 November 2019 it was confirmed, that Begaj would join Jönköpings Södra IF from the 2020 season, signing a two-year deal. However, on 17 March 2020, he joined Ljungskile SK instead.

In January 2021, Beqaj returned to Jönköpings Södra, where he signed a two-year contract. However, he left the club again at the end of 2021.

On 10 February 2022, Beqaj signed with Norrby.

Personal life
Born in Sweden, Beqaj is of Kosovan descent.

References

External links

Perparim Beqaj at Fotbolltransfers

1995 births
Living people
People from Laholm Municipality
Swedish footballers
Swedish people of Kosovan descent
Association football forwards
Halmstads BK players
Varbergs BoIS players
Jönköpings Södra IF players
Ljungskile SK players
Allsvenskan players
Superettan players
Tvååkers IF players
Norrby IF players
Ettan Fotboll players